Liridon Balaj (born 15 August 1999) is a Kosovan footballer who plays as a midfielder for Belgian club Deinze and the Kosovo national team.

Club career

Aarau
On 7 August 2019, Balaj signed a two-year contract with Swiss Challenge League club Aarau and received squad number 9. One day later, he made his debut in a 4–2 away defeat against Chiasso after coming on as a substitute at 74th minute in place of Petar Mišić.

Deinze
On 2 September 2022, Balaj joined Deinze in Belgium on a two-year contract.

International career
On 31 May 2021, Balaj received a call-up from Kosovo for the friendly matches against Guinea and Gambia. Eight days later, he made his debut with Kosovo in a friendly match against Guinea after coming on as a substitute at 46th minute in place of Arbër Hoxha.

References

External links

1998 births
Living people
People from La Chaux-de-Fonds
Sportspeople from the canton of Neuchâtel
Swiss people of Kosovan descent
Swiss people of Albanian descent
Kosovan footballers
Kosovo youth international footballers
Kosovo international footballers
Swiss men's footballers
Association football midfielders
KF Besa players
FC Aarau players
K.M.S.K. Deinze players
Football Superleague of Kosovo players
Swiss Challenge League players
Challenger Pro League players
Kosovan expatriate footballers
Expatriate footballers in Belgium
Kosovan expatriate sportspeople in Belgium